The Day After is an American television film that first aired on November 20, 1983 on the ABC television network. More than 100 million people, in nearly 39 million households, watched the film during its initial broadcast. With a 46 rating and a 62% share of the viewing audience during the initial broadcast, the film was the seventh-highest-rated non-sports show until then, and it set a record as the highest-rated television film in history, which it held as of 2009.

The film postulates a fictional war between NATO forces and the Warsaw Pact over Germany that rapidly escalates into a full-scale nuclear exchange between the United States and the Soviet Union. The action itself focuses on the residents of Lawrence, Kansas; of Kansas City, Missouri; and of several family farms near nuclear missile silos.

The cast includes JoBeth Williams, Steve Guttenberg, John Cullum, Jason Robards, and John Lithgow. The film was written by Edward Hume, produced by Robert Papazian, and directed by Nicholas Meyer. It was released on DVD on May 18, 2004 by MGM.

The film was broadcast on Soviet state television in 1987, during the negotiations on Intermediate-Range Nuclear Forces Treaty. The producers demanded for the Russian translation to conform to the original script and for the broadcast not to be interrupted by commentary.

Plot 

Dr. Russell Oakes (Jason Robards) works at a hospital in Kansas City, Missouri, and spends time with his family over his daughter Marilyn's decision to move away. In Harrisonville, Missouri, 40 miles southeast of Kansas City, farmer Jim Dahlberg (John Cullum) and family hold a wedding dress rehearsal for their eldest daughter, Denise (Lori Lethin), and Bruce, a student at the University of Kansas in Lawrence, Kansas. The young couple is more interested in sex, with family drama when Denise's younger sister steals her birth control, and when Jim catches Denise sneaking home the following morning. Airman First Class Billy McCoy (William Allen Young) mans a Minuteman launch site in Sweetsage, Missouri, 20 miles east of Kansas City. Next to the site, the Hendrys farm, do chores, and mind the children. Throughout these scenes of heartland life is a current of tension: the television, radio, and newspapers chatter about a Warsaw Pact build-up on the East German border and the dispatch of nuclear weapons in Europe. Toward the night, East Germany blockades West Berlin. The US issues an ultimatum calling for the Soviets to end the blockade of West Berlin by the evening and places its military forces on high alert, which recalls McCoy from his wife and infant daughter at Whiteman Air Force Base near Sedalia, Missouri. 

The next day, NATO forces attempt to break the blockade through the Helmstedt-Marienborn checkpoint, suffering heavy casualties. Warsaw Pact MiGs strike civilian and military targets in West Germany. Oakes visits his son's football game, but daily life is starting to break down. Moscow is evacuated, and people start to flee Kansas City. At the university's registration hall, the word goes out that the Soviets have invaded West Germany. NATO is unable to stop the Soviet invasion and threatens the use of nuclear weapons should the Soviets continue advancing south towards the rest of Western Europe. Pre-med student Stephen Klein (Steve Guttenberg) decides to hitchhike home to Joplin, Missouri, while Bruce presses on as normal and gets a haircut, but at a supermarket he's faced with a crowd frantically pulling items off the shelves. Americans and Soviets attack naval targets in the Persian Gulf, and there are rumors of nuclear strikes on the outskirts of Frankfurt  and Wiesbaden. Oakes is stuck in traffic driving to the campus hospital in Lawrence when the Emergency Broadcast System warnings begin. Failing to contact his wife, he turns back toward Kansas City.

NATO airbursts three tactical nuclear weapons over advancing Soviet forces hoping to halt the Soviet invasion. In response, a Soviet nuclear attack destroys the regional NATO headquarters. Minutes apart, the United States launches its Minuteman missiles, and personnel aboard the EC-135 Looking Glass over Kansas track inbound Soviet ICBMs. The film deliberately leaves unclear who fired first. McCoy makes it to the Sweetsage base and learns Beale Air Force Base and RAF Fylingdales have been destroyed. Saying the war's over and they've done their jobs, he flees to find his family. Air raid sirens go off and panic grips Kansas City.

Shortly before the ICBMs arrive, a high-altitude nuclear explosion over the Central United States generates an EMP that disables vehicles and destroys the electrical grid across the region. The nuclear strikes then commence as the ICBMs strike their targets. Kansas City and the surrounding military bases and missile silos are destroyed by the nuclear missiles.  Marilyn and Bruce are incinerated. The Hendrys, having initially ignored the crisis, never make it out of their yard. Looking at a nuclear detonation flash-blinds the young Danny Dahlberg. Oakes witnesses an explosion over Kansas City, walks to Lawrence, takes charge and begins treating patients. Klein, who had hitchhiked as far as Harrisonville, finds the Dahlberg home and begs for protection in the family's basement.

Oakes receives fallout reports by shortwave from faculty head Joe Huxley at the science building, but the situation is dismal: travel outdoors is a death sentence, yet patients continue to come. Huxley tries to contact other survivors, with no response. Delirious after days in the basement shelter, Denise runs outside. Klein retrieves her, but they go through a field thick with radioactive dust. McCoy heads to Sedalia until he hears it and its environs are no longer there. He makes friends with a mute man and travels to the hospital in Lawrence, where he dies of radiation poisoning. Oakes bonds with Nurse Bauer (JoBeth Williams), who later dies of meningitis, and converses with a hopeless, overdue pregnant woman who pleads him to tell her she's wrong. 

The rad count ebbs. Denise bleeds through her skirt in a service in the rubble of a church, and Klein takes her and Danny to the hospital in Lawrence, where a doctor unsuccessfully tries to treat Danny's eyes. In a defiant radio address the President announces a ceasefire with the Soviets, promises relief, and stresses liberty, democracy, and American leadership, set to shots of listless survivors in America's blackened husk, and hospital staff piling up the dead and treating the living by candlelight. Soldiers do deliver food to the refugee camp that's grown around the hospital. They're unable to honor issued chits, and hold food back for other camps, ending in a violent squabble in which some survivors and soldiers are killed. Oakes learns that various criminals are being summarily executed by a firing squad without first being proven guilty, including for petty crimes such as alleged looting. At a makeshift civilian gathering regarding agriculture, a meeting for growing enough food for the survivors lays out grandiose government plans (scrape 4-5 inches off your fields) but is unable to answer Jim's basic questions (with 150-200 acres to a man? Put it where? Farm in what topsoil?) Coming home, Jim is shot and killed by squatters. Denise is balding, bruised, and dying, and Klein too has radiation sickness.

At last aware that he has sustained lethal exposure to radiation, Oakes returns to Kansas City to see the site of his home before he dies. He finds squatters there and attempts to drive them off, but he is instead offered food. Oakes collapses and weeps, and one of the squatters comforts him. The film ends with an overlying audio clip of Huxley's voice on the radio as the screen fades to black, asking if anybody can still hear him, only to be met with silence until the credits roll.

Ending disclaimer
Most versions of The Day After include an American-English textual ending disclaimer just before the end credits, stating that the film is fictional, and that the real-life outcome of a nuclear war would be much worse than the events portrayed onscreen.

Cast 

 The Oakeses
 Jason Robards as Dr. Russell Oakes
 Georgann Johnson as Helen Oakes
 Kyle Aletter as Marilyn Oakes

 The Dahlbergs
 John Cullum as Jim Dahlberg
 Bibi Besch as Eve Dahlberg
 Lori Lethin as Denise Dahlberg
 Doug Scott as Danny Dahlberg
 Ellen Anthony as Joleen Dahlberg

 Hospital staff
 JoBeth Williams as Nurse Nancy Bauer
 Calvin Jung as Dr. Sam Hachiya
 Lin McCarthy as Dr. Austin
 Rosanna Huffman as Dr. Wallenberg
 George Petrie as Dr. Landowska
 Jonathan Estrin as Julian French
 Wayne Knight as Man in Hospital

 Others
 Steve Guttenberg as Stephen Klein
 John Lithgow as Joe Huxley
 Amy Madigan as Alison Ransom
 William Allen Young as Airman First Class Billy McCoy
 Jeff East as Bruce Gallatin
 Dennis Lipscomb as Reverend Walker
 Clayton Day as Dennis Hendry
 Antonie Becker as Ellen Hendry
 Stephen Furst as Aldo
 Arliss Howard as Tom Cooper
 Stan Wilson as Vinnie Conrad
 Harry Bugin as Man at phone

Production 
The Day After was the idea of ABC Motion Picture Division President Brandon Stoddard, who, after watching The China Syndrome, was so impressed that he envisioned creating a film exploring the effects of nuclear war on the United States. Stoddard asked his executive vice president of television movies and miniseries, Stu Samuels, to develop a script. Samuels created the title The Day After to emphasize that the story was about not a nuclear war itself but the aftermath. Samuels suggested several writers, and eventually, Stoddard commissioned the veteran television writer Edward Hume to write the script in 1981. ABC, which financed the production, was concerned about the graphic nature of the film and how to portray the subject appropriately on a family-oriented television channel. Hume undertook a massive amount of research on nuclear war and went through several drafts until ABC finally deemed the plot and characters acceptable.

Originally, the film was based more around and in Kansas City, Missouri. Kansas City was not bombed in the original script although Whiteman Air Force Base was, which made Kansas City suffer shock waves and the horde of survivors staggering into town. There was no Lawrence, Kansas, in the story although there was a small Kansas town called "Hampton." While Hume was writing the script, he and the producer Robert Papazian, who had great experience in on-location shooting, took several trips to Kansas City to scout locations and met with officials from the Kansas film commission and from the Kansas tourist offices to search for a suitable location for "Hampton." It came down to a choice of either Warrensburg, Missouri, and Lawrence, Kansas, both college towns. Warrensburg the was home of Central Missouri State University and was near Whiteman Air Force Base, and Lawrence was home of the University of Kansas and was near Kansas City. Hume and Papazian ended up selecting Lawrence because of the access to a number of good locations: a university, a hospital, football and basketball venues, farms, and a flat countryside. Lawrence was also agreed upon as being the "geographic center" of the United States. The Lawrence people were urging ABC to change the name "Hampton" to "Lawrence" in the script.

Back in Los Angeles, the idea of making a TV movie showing the true effects of nuclear war on average American citizens was still stirring up controversy. ABC, Hume, and Papazian realized that for the scene depicting the nuclear blast, they would have to use state-of-the-art special effects and so took the first step by hiring some of the best special effects people in the business to draw up some storyboards for the complicated blast scene. ABC then hired Robert Butler to direct the project. For several months, the group worked on drawing up storyboards and revising the script again and again. Then, in early 1982, Butler was forced to leave The Day After because of other contractual commitments. ABC then offered the project to two other directors, who both turned it down. Finally, in May, ABC hired the feature film director Nicholas Meyer, who had just completed the blockbuster Star Trek II: The Wrath of Khan. Meyer was apprehensive at first and doubted ABC would get away with making a television film on nuclear war without the censors diminishing its effect. However, after reading the script, Meyer agreed to direct The Day After.

Meyer wanted to make sure that he would film the script he was offered. He did not want the censors to censor the film or the film to be a regular Hollywood disaster movie from the start. Meyer figured the more The Day After resembled such a film, the less effective it would be, and he preferred to present the facts of nuclear war to viewers. He made it clear to ABC that no big TV or film stars should be in The Day After. ABC agreed but wanted to have one star to help attract European audiences to the film when it would be shown theatrically there. Later, while flying to visit his parents in New York City, Meyer happened to be on the same plane with Jason Robards and asked him to join the cast.

Meyer plunged into several months of nuclear research, which made him quite pessimistic about the future, to the point of becoming ill each evening when he came home from work. Meyer and Papazian also made trips to the ABC censors and to the United States Department of Defense during their research phase and experienced conflicts with both. Meyer had many heated arguments over elements in the script that the network censors wanted cut out of the film. The Department of Defense said that it would cooperate with ABC if the script clarified that the Soviets launched their missiles first, which Meyer and Papazian took pains not to do.

Meyer, Papazian, Hume, and several casting directors spent most of July 1982 taking numerous trips to Kansas City. In between casting in Los Angeles, where they relied mostly on unknowns, they would fly to the Kansas City area to interview local actors and scenery. They were hoping to find some real Midwesterners for smaller roles. Hollywood casting directors strolled through shopping malls in Kansas City to look for local people to fill small and supporting roles, and the daily newspaper in Lawrence ran an advertisement calling for local residents of all ages to sign up for jobs as many extras in the film and a professor of theater and film at the University of Kansas were hired to head up the local casting of the movie. Out of the eighty or so speaking parts, only fifteen were cast in Los Angeles. The remaining roles were filled in Kansas City and Lawrence.

While in Kansas City, Meyer and Papazian toured the Federal Emergency Management Agency offices in Kansas City. When asked about its plans for surviving nuclear war, a FEMA official replied that it was experimenting with putting evacuation instructions in telephone books in New England. "In about six years, everyone should have them." That meeting led Meyer to later refer to FEMA as "a complete joke." It was during that time that the decision was made to change "Hampton" in the script to "Lawrence." Meyer and Hume figured since Lawrence was a real town, it would be more believable, and besides, it was a perfect choice to play a representative of Middle America. The town boasted a "socio-cultural mix," sat near the exact geographic center of the Continental U.S., and was a prime missile target according to Hume and Meyer's research because 150 Minuteman missile silos stood nearby. Lawrence had some great locations, and its people were more supportive of the project. Suddenly, less emphasis was put on Kansas City, the decision was made to have the city annihilated in the script, and Lawrence was made the primary location in the film.

Editing 
ABC originally planned to air The Day After as a four-hour "television event" that would be spread over two nights with a total running time of 180 minutes without commercials. The director Nicholas Meyer felt the original script was padded, and suggested cutting out an hour of material to present the whole film in one night. The network stuck with its two-night broadcast plan, and Meyer filmed the entire three-hour script, as evidenced by a 172-minute workprint that has surfaced. Subsequently, the network found that it was difficult to find advertisers because of the subject matter. ABC relented and allowed Meyer to edit the film for a one-night broadcast version. Meyer's original single-night cut ran two hours and twenty minutes, which he presented to the network. After that screening, many executives were deeply moved, and some even cried, which led Meyer to believe they approved of his cut.

Nevertheless, a further six-month struggle ensued over the final shape of the film. Network censors had opinions about the inclusion of specific scenes, and ABC itself was eventually intent on "trimming the film to the bone" and made demands to cut out many scenes that Meyer strongly lobbied to keep. Finally, Meyer and his editor, Bill Dornisch, balked. Dornisch was fired, and Meyer walked away from the project. ABC brought in other editors, but the network ultimately was not happy with the results they produced. It finally brought Meyer back and reached a compromise, with Meyer paring down The Day After to a final running time of 120 minutes.

Broadcast 
The Day After was initially scheduled to premiere on ABC in May 1983, but the post-production work to reduce the film's length pushed back its initial airdate to November. Censors forced ABC to cut an entire scene of a child having a nightmare about nuclear holocaust and then sitting up screaming. A psychiatrist told ABC that it would disturb children. "This strikes me as ludicrous," Meyer wrote in TV Guide at the time, "not only in relation to the rest of the film, but also when contrasted with the huge doses of violence to be found on any average evening of TV viewing." In any case, a few more cuts were made, including to a scene in which Denise possesses a diaphragm. Another scene in which a hospital patient abruptly sits up screaming was excised from the original television broadcast but restored for home video releases. Meyer persuaded ABC to dedicate the film to the citizens of Lawrence and also to put a disclaimer at the end of the film after the credits to let the viewer know that The Day After downplayed the true effects of nuclear war so it could have a story. The disclaimer also included a list of books that provided more information on the subject.

The Day After received a large promotional campaign prior to its broadcast. Commercials aired several months in advance, and ABC distributed half-a-million "viewer's guides" that discussed the dangers of nuclear war and prepared the viewer for the graphic scenes of mushroom clouds and radiation burn victims. Discussion groups were also formed nationwide.

Music 
The composer David Raksin wrote original music and adapted music from The River, a documentary film score by the concert composer Virgil Thomson, by featuring an adaptation of the hymn "How Firm a Foundation". Although he recorded just under 30 minutes of music, much of it was edited out of the final cut. Music from the First Strike footage, conversely, was not edited out.

Deleted and alternative scenes 

The film was shortened from the original three hours of running time to two, which caused the scrapping of several planned special-effects scenes although storyboards were made in anticipation of a possible "expanded" version. They included a "bird's eye" view of Kansas City at the moment of two nuclear detonations as seen from a Boeing 737 airliner approaching the city's airport, simulated newsreel footage of U.S. troops in West Germany taking up positions in preparation of advancing Soviet armored units, and the tactical nuclear exchange in Germany between NATO and the Warsaw Pact after the attacking Warsaw Pact force breaks through and overwhelms the NATO lines.

ABC censors severely toned down scenes to reduce the body count or severe burn victims. Meyer refused to remove key scenes, but reportedly, some eight-and-a-half minutes of excised footage still exist, significantly more graphic. Some footage was reinstated for the film's release on home video. Additionally, the nuclear attack scene was longer and supposed to feature very graphic and very accurate shots of what happens to a human body during a nuclear blast. Examples included people being set on fire; their flesh carbonizing; being burned to the bone; eyes melting; faceless heads; skin hanging; deaths from flying glass and debris, limbs torn off, being crushed, and blown from buildings by the shockwave; and people in fallout shelters suffocating during the firestorm. Also cut were images of radiation sickness, as well as graphic post-attack violence from survivors such as food riots, looting, and general lawlessness as authorities attempted to restore order.

One cut scene showed surviving students battling over food. The two sides were to be athletes and the science students under the guidance of Professor Huxley. Another brief scene that was later cut related to a firing squad in which two U.S. soldiers are blindfolded and executed. In that scene, an officer reads the charges, verdict, and sentence as a bandaged chaplain reads the Last Rites. A similar sequence occurs in a 1965 British-produced faux documentary, The War Game. In the initial 1983 broadcast of The Day After, when the U.S. president addresses the nation, the voice was an imitation of President Reagan, who later stated that he watched the film and was deeply moved. In subsequent broadcasts, that voice was overdubbed by a stock actor.

Home video releases in the U.S. and internationally come in at various running times, many listed at 126 or 127 minutes. Full screen (4:3 aspect ratio) seems to be more common than widescreen. RCA videodiscs of the early 1980s were limited to 2 hours per disc so that full screen release appears to be closest to what originally aired on ABC in the U.S. A 2001 U.S. VHS version (Anchor Bay Entertainment, Troy, Michigan) lists a running time of 122 minutes. A 1995 double laser disc "director's cut" version (Image Entertainment) runs 127 minutes, includes commentary by director Nicholas Meyer and is "presented in its 1.75:1 European theatrical aspect ratio" (according to the LD jacket).

Two different German DVD releases run at 122 and 115 minutes respectively; the edits reportedly downplay the Soviet Union's role.

A two disc Blu-ray special edition was released in 2018 by the video specialty label Kino Lorber and present the film in high definition. The release contains the 122-minute television cut, presented in a 4:3 aspect ratio as broadcast, as well as the 127-minute theatrical cut, presented in a 16:9 widescreen aspect ratio.

Reception 
On its original broadcast, on Sunday, November 20, 1983, John Cullum warned viewers before the film was premiered that the film contains graphic and disturbing scenes and encouraged parents who had young children watching to watch together and discuss the issues of nuclear warfare. ABC and local TV affiliates opened 1-800 hotlines with counselors standing by. There were no commercial breaks after the nuclear attack scenes. ABC then aired a live debate on Viewpoint, ABC's occasional discussion program hosted by Nightlines Ted Koppel, featuring the scientist Carl Sagan, former Secretary of State Henry Kissinger, Elie Wiesel, former Secretary of Defense Robert McNamara, General Brent Scowcroft, and the commentator William F. Buckley Jr. Sagan argued against nuclear proliferation, but Buckley promoted the concept of nuclear deterrence. Sagan described the arms race in the following terms: "Imagine a room awash in gasoline, and there are two implacable enemies in that room. One of them has nine thousand matches, the other seven thousand matches. Each of them is concerned about who's ahead, who's stronger."

The film and its subject matter were prominently featured in the news media both before and after the broadcast, including on such covers as TIME, Newsweek, U.S. News & World Report, and TV Guide.

Critics tended to claim the film was sensationalizing nuclear war or that it was too tame. The special effects and realistic portrayal of nuclear war received praise. The film received 12 Emmy nominations and won two Emmy awards. It was rated "way above average" in Leonard Maltin's Movie Guide until all reviews for films exclusive to television were removed from the publication.

In the United States, 38.5 million households, or an estimated 100 million people, watched The Day After on its first broadcast, a record audience for a made-for-TV movie. Producers Sales Organization released the film theatrically around the world, in the Eastern Bloc, China, North Korea and Cuba (this international version contained six minutes of footage not in the telecast edition). Since commercials are not sold in those markets, Producers Sales Organization failed to gain revenue to the tune of an undisclosed sum. Years later, the international version was released to tape by Embassy Home Entertainment.

The actor and former Nixon adviser Ben Stein, critical of the movie's message that the strategy of mutual assured destruction would lead to a war, wrote in the Los Angeles Herald-Examiner what life might be like in an America under Soviet occupation. Stein's idea was eventually dramatized in the miniseries Amerika, also broadcast by ABC.

The New York Post accused Meyer of being a traitor, writing, "Why is Nicholas Meyer doing Yuri Andropov's work for him?" Phyllis Schlafly declared that "This film was made by people who want to disarm the country, and who are willing to make a $7 million contribution to that cause". Richard Grenier in the National Review accused The Day After of promoting "unpatriotic" and pro-Soviet attitudes. Much press comment focused on the unanswered question in the film of who started the war.

The television critic Matt Zoller Seitz, in his 2016 book co-written with Alan Sepinwall, TV (The Book), named The Day After as the fourth-greatest American TV movie of all time: "Very possibly the bleakest TV-movie ever broadcast, The Day After is an explicitly antiwar statement dedicated entirely to showing audiences what would happen if nuclear weapons were used on civilian populations in the United States."

Effects on policymakers 

US President Ronald Reagan watched the film more than a month before its screening on Columbus Day, October 10, 1983. He wrote in his diary that the film was "very effective and left me greatly depressed" and that it changed his mind on the prevailing policy on a "nuclear war". The film was also screened for the Joint Chiefs of Staff. A government advisor who attended the screening, a friend of Meyer, told him: "If you wanted to draw blood, you did it. Those guys sat there like they were turned to stone." In 1987, Reagan and Soviet Premier Mikhail Gorbachev signed the Intermediate-Range Nuclear Forces Treaty, which resulted in the banning and reducing of their nuclear arsenal. In Reagan's memoirs, he drew a direct line from the film to the signing. Reagan supposedly later sent Meyer a telegram after the summit: "Don't think your movie didn't have any part of this, because it did." During an interview in 2010, Meyer said that the telegram was a myth and that the sentiment stemmed from a friend's letter to Meyer. He suggested the story had origins in editing notes received from the White House during the production, which "may have been a joke, but it wouldn't surprise me, him being an old Hollywood guy."

The film also had impact outside the United States. In 1987, during the era of Gorbachev's glasnost and perestroika reforms, the film was shown on Soviet television. Four years earlier, Georgia Representative Elliott Levitas and 91 co-sponsors introduced a resolution in the U.S. House of Representatives "[expressing] the sense of the Congress that the American Broadcasting Company, the Department of State, and the U.S. Information Agency should work to have the television movie The Day After aired to the Soviet public."

Accolades 
The Day After won two Emmy Awards and received 10 other Emmy nominations.

Emmy Awards won:
 Outstanding Film Sound Editing for a Limited Series or a Special
 Outstanding Achievement in Special Visual Effects

Emmy Award nominations:
 Outstanding Achievement in Hairstyling
 Outstanding Achievement in Makeup
 Outstanding Art Direction for a Limited Series or a Special (Peter Wooley)
 Outstanding Cinematography for a Limited Series or a Special (Gayne Rescher)
 Outstanding Directing in a Limited Series or a Special (Nicholas Meyer)
 Outstanding Drama/Comedy Special (Robert Papazian)
 Outstanding Film Editing for a Limited Series or a Special (William Dornisch and Robert Florio)
 Outstanding Film Sound Mixing for a Limited Series or a Special
 Outstanding Supporting Actor in a Limited Series or a Special (John Lithgow)
 Outstanding Writing in a Limited Series or a Special (Edward Hume)

See also 
 Television Event, a documentary film about the making and release of the film 
 Testament, a television film moved to theatrical release two weeks before The Day After aired
 Threads, a British television film that centres on a nuclear war and the societal after-effects
 List of nuclear holocaust fiction
 Nuclear weapons in popular culture

References

Further reading 
 Cheers, Michael, "Search for TV Stars Not Yielding Right Types", Kansas City Times, July 19, 1982.
 Twardy, Chuck, "Moviemakers Cast About for Local Crowds", Lawrence Journal-World, August 16, 1982.
 Twardy, Chuck, "Fake Farmstead Goes Up in Flames for Film", Lawrence Journal-World, August 17, 1982.
 Laird, Linda, "The Days Before 'The Day After, Midway, the Sunday Magazine Section of the Topeka Capital-Journal, August 22, 1982.
 Twardy, Chuck, "Shooting on Schedule 'Day After' Movie", Lawrence Journal-World, August 23, 1982.
 Lazzarino, Evie, "From Production Crew to Extras, a Day in the Life of 'Day After, Lawrence Journal-World, August 29, 1982.
 Rosenberg, Howard, Humanizing' Nuclear Devastation in Kansas", Los Angeles Times, September 1, 1982.
 Schrenier, Bruce, The Day After' Filming Continues at KU", University Daily Kansan, September 2, 1982.
 Appelbaum, Sharon, "Lawrence Folks Are Dying for a Part in TV's Armageddon", The Kansas City Star, September 3, 1982.
 Hitchcock, Doug, "Movie Makeup Manufactures Medical Mess", Lawrence Journal-World, September 5, 1982.
 Twardy, Chuck, "Nicholas Meyer Tackles Biggest Fantasy", Lawrence Journal-World, September 5, 1982.
 Twardy, Chuck, "How to Spend $1 Million in Lawrence", Lawrence Journal-World, September 5, 1982.
 Twardy, Chuck, "Students Assume War-Torn Look as Film Shooting Winds Down", Lawrence Journal-World, September 8, 1982.
 Goodman, Howard, "KC 'Holocaust' a Mix of Horror and Hollywood", Kansas City Times, September 11, 1982.
 Jordan, Gerald B., "Local Filming of Nuclear Disaster Almost Fizzles", The Kansas City Star, September 13, 1982.
 Kindall, James, "Apocalypse Now", The Kansas City Star Weekly Magazine, October 17, 1982.
 Loverock, Patricia, "ABC Films Nuclear Holocaust in Kansas", On Location magazine, November 1983.
 Bauman, Melissa, "ABC Official Denies Network Can't Find Sponsors for Show", Lawrence Journal-World, November 13, 1983.
 Meyer, Nicholas, The Day After': Bringing the Unwatchable to TV", TV Guide, November 19, 1983.
 Torriero, E.A., "The Day Before 'The Day After, Kansas City Times, November 20, 1983.
 Hoenk, Mary, Day After': Are Young Viewers Ready?", Lawrence Journal-World, November 20, 1983.
 Helliker, Kevin, Day After' Yields a Grim Evening", Kansas City Times, November 21, 1983.
 Trowbridge, Caroline and Hoenk, Mary, "Film's Fallout: A Solemn Plea for Peace", Lawrence Journal-World, November 21, 1983.
 Greenberger, Robert, "Nicholas Meyer: Witness at the End of the World", Starlog magazine, January 1984.
 Eisenberg, Adam, "Waging a Four-Minute War", Cinefex magazine, January 1984.

External links 
 
 
 

1983 films
1983 television films
1980s disaster films
1983 drama films
1980s science fiction films
1980s war films
ABC Motion Pictures films
ABC network original films
American disaster films
American survival films
American political drama films
American television docudramas
American war drama films
Anti-war films
Anti-nuclear films
Anti–nuclear weapons movement
Anti-nuclear movement in the United States
Films about nuclear war and weapons
Cold War films
Apocalyptic films
Disaster television films
Films directed by Nicholas Meyer
Films scored by David Raksin
Films set in Kansas
The Day After
Films shot in Kansas
Films shot in Missouri
Day After, The
American post-apocalyptic films
Science fiction war films
Films about World War III
American science fiction war films
American science fiction television films
1980s English-language films
1980s American films
Films set in bunkers